The Moose River is a mountain waterway in Upstate New York which consists of three branches: the North Branch, the Middle Branch and the South Branch. The outlet of Big Moose Lake forms the North Branch in northern Herkimer County. The Middle Branch originates at the Fulton Chain Lakes in Old Forge. And the Southern Branch has its headwaters in Little Moose Lake in Hamilton County. The North and Middle branches merge in old Forge, New York, then flow a few miles before merging with the South branch, and then becomes just Moose River. It flows generally westwardly through Herkimer County into Lewis County, reaching its confluence with the Black River in Lyons Falls.

Geography 

Owing to its high gradient as it drops out of the mountains, The Moose is a favorite destination for whitewater rafters, kayakers and canoeists. There are three whitewater sections below McKeever with increasing degrees of difficulty. The Middle Moose is a Class II-III section of river from the gaging station in McKeever to Rock Island. The Lower is a Class III-V section from Rock Island to just above Fowlerville Falls, which is run commercially in early spring and includes drops such as Tannery, Froth Hole, Mixmaster and Miller's Falls. The Bottom Moose is a Class V+ section from Fowlerville on. In the Spring and Fall of each year, hundreds of whitewater paddlers descend on the Moose from all parts of the US and eastern Canada. The Bottom Moose (see below), in particular, is a favorite run for paddlers who enjoy Class-V whitewater. This run has several waterfalls, ranging from straightforward and easy to difficult and dangerous.

Also because of its high gradient, there are several hydropower projects along the Moose's course.

See also
Adirondack League Club v. Sierra Club
List of New York rivers
Old Forge

References

External links 
American Whitewater River Inventory: Middle Moose
American Whitewater River Inventory: Lower Moose
American Whitewater River Inventory: Bottom Moose

Rivers of New York (state)
Rivers of Hamilton County, New York
Rivers of Herkimer County, New York
Rivers of Lewis County, New York
Rivers of Oneida County, New York